National Junior College Athletic Association (NJCAA) national football champions:

Champions

Single Division (1956–2021) 

For the 2021 season, the NJCAA announced the creation of Division I and Division III, along with implementing a Division I national championship playoff system for the 2021 fall season. Prior to the fall of 2021, NJCAA Football consisted of a single division. Due to COVID-19, the 2020 fall season was postponed until the spring of 2021 and is denoted in the record book as the 2020–21 season.
1961–1963   no champion

Division I (2021–present)

Division III (2021–present)

Championship games

Single Division (1956–2021)

Division I (2021–present)

Division III (2021–present)

Top Non-Scholarship (2000–2010) 
From 2000–2010, the NJCAA recognized the top non-scholarship team in the nation.

National Championships by team

See also
 College football national championships in NCAA Division I FBS
 NCAA Division I Football Championship
 NCAA Division I FCS Consensus Mid-Major Football National Championship
 NCAA Division II National Football Championship
 NCAA Division III National Football Championship
 NAIA National Football Championship

References

Additional sources
 NJCAA record book
 Source about 1960 and 2007 shared titles

National championship
Football